The following is a list of episodes of the American science fiction television drama Eureka. Seventy-seven episodes were aired over five seasons. In addition to these episodes, there is a short webisode series called "Hide and Seek", which was available on Syfy's Eureka homepage.

The episodes of the first season were not aired in the order intended by the show's creators, resulting in small inconsistencies. However, these were supervised and controlled. In podcast commentaries, the show's creators and its star Colin Ferguson confirmed that the production order was that in which the producers intended. However, network executives changed the order to try to place the stronger episodes earlier in the run to attract viewers.

The creators made minor changes through edits and they redubbed dialogue in later episodes (for instance, they removed the explicit mention of Zoe's first day at school) to minimize audience confusion.

Series overview

Episodes

Season 1 (2006)

Season 2 (2007)

Season 3 (2008–09) 
Season three production was interrupted and delayed by the 2007–2008 Writers Guild of America strike.

Season 4 (2010–11) 
Season four included the first crossover event with the Syfy series Warehouse 13. Douglas Fargo (Neil Grayston) appeared in the August 3, 2010 episode of Warehouse 13, while Claudia Donovan (Allison Scagliotti) of Warehouse 13 appeared on Eureka on August 6, 2010. James Callis joined the cast as Dr. Trevor Grant, a scientist from 1947.

Season 4 was made in two parts and two stand alone Christmas specials. The first nine episodes were shown in the US summer of 2010. A Christmas episode was shown in December 2010 and another 10 episodes began airing on July 11, 2011. A second Christmas special aired on December 6, 2011.

Season 5 (2012) 
On August 17, 2010, Syfy announced that there would be a fifth season. On August 8, 2011, it was announced that season 5 was to be the final season; it was later announced that the network had ordered an additional episode for season 5 to wrap up the series. On February 16, 2012, Syfy announced that the show's fifth and final season would premiere on April 16, 2012. The season concluded on July 16, 2012.

Webisodes

Hide and Seek (2006)

References

External links 
 List of Eureka episodes at Syfy
 
 
 Eureka at YouTube - syfy.cz

 
Eureka